Margou may refer to several places in Burkina Faso:

Margou, Manni
Margou, Piéla